= Balkanarama =

Balkanarama is a band based in Seattle, Washington that originated in 1997. As the name of the band implies, the group plays mostly interpretations of traditional Gypsy music and popular songs from The Balkans. Balkanarama has independently produced three albums.

Members of the band include: Kevin Stevens, Eva Moon, Mike Gordon, Sue Niemann and Ferko Saxmanov.

== Discography ==
- Nonstop (2000)
- Black Sea (2002)
- Balkanarama Live (2006)
